Population Research and Policy Review is a bimonthly peer-reviewed academic journal covering demography. It was established in 1982 and is published by Springer Science+Business Media on behalf of the Southern Demographic Association, of which it is the official journal. The editors-in-chief are Kara Joyner and Corey Sparks (both at The University of Texas at San Antonio). According to the Journal Citation Reports, the journal has a 2020 impact factor of 2.051.

References

External links

Demography journals
Springer Science+Business Media academic journals
Publications established in 1982
Bimonthly journals
English-language journals